David Scheller (born October 12, 1972) is a German actor.

Since the early 1990s he appeared in many German TV- and film productions and also participated in a few international movies like Fay Grim or Extreme Ops. In series and films David Scheller often plays dubious characters and criminals.

In one of his most famous roles, David Scheller stars as Dieter Bockhorn, the former companion of Uschi Obermaier in the German film Eight Miles High.

David Scheller lives in Berlin.

Filmography (selection)
 1992: Geteilte Nacht
 1992: Marienhof (TV-series)
 1994: Tatort (TV-series)
 1997: Mord für eine Schlagzeile (TV-movie)
 1998: Explodiert
 2000: 
 2000: Zärtliche Sterne (TV-movie)
 2001:  (TV-movie)
 2001: 
 2001: Tatort (TV-series)
 2002: Extreme Ops
 2003: Polizeiruf 110 (TV-series)
 2003: 
 2003: Yu
 2005: Die Bullenbraut – Ihr erster Fall (TV-movie)
 2005: Katze im Sack
 2005: 
 2005: Your Name is Justine
 2005:  –  (TV-series)
 2005: The Eagle (TV-series)
 2006: SK Kölsch (TV-series)
 2006: Fay Grim
 2006: Where Is Fred?
 2007: Pastewka (TV-series)
 2007: Eight Miles High
 2008: The Lost Samaritan
 2008: Großstadtrevier (TV-series)
 2008: Morgen räum' ich auf (TV-movie)
 2009: Commissario Laurenti (TV-series)
 2015: Der Bunker
 2015: ''Buddha's Little Finger

References

External links

1971 births
Living people
Male actors from Munich
German male film actors
German male television actors